Kesser Torah College (lit., "Crown of Torah") is an independent Chabad Ultra Orthodox co-educational early learning, primary and secondary day school, located in , an eastern suburb of Sydney, New South Wales, Australia. The college provides education from preschool through Kindergarten to Year 12.

Kesser Torah was incorporated in December 2003 and has grown to accommodate over 500 students catering to over 300 families.

Education Programs
Kesser Torah College incorporated in December 2003 as a Jewish orthodox school with a Chabad, Lubavitch ethos.  It has grown to accommodate over 500 students catering to over 300 families. With a staff complement of 90 professionals, the school is committed to enhancing academic and extra-curricular learning for each child as an individual, and to providing the highest quality Jewish educational through the teachings of Chasidus and other Jewish manuscripts. While still catering a high class secular education, as well as pastoral care. The teachings of the Lubavitcher Rebbe continue to define the educational philosophy of Kesser Torah College.

The college is co-educational to Year 1. Boys and girls are taught separately from Years 2–6 in the primary school and in the high school.

Because the Jewish Studies and General Studies programs across the entire school are integrated, students can learn first hand how an excellent general education can enhance life as a Torah Jew and how spirituality can give meaning to their existence, undertakings and activities throughout life.

Leadership 
Former principals include Yehuda Spielman, principal for three years. Noteh Glogauer, principal for eight years. Samuel Gurewicz held title of acting principal. The current principal is Roy Steinman.

See also 

 List of non-government schools in New South Wales
 Judaism in Australia

References

External links 
 Kesser Torah website

Chabad schools
Educational institutions established in 2003
Jews and Judaism in Sydney
Jewish secondary schools in Sydney
2003 establishments in Australia
Jewish primary schools in Sydney